Rough Common is a village in Canterbury in the parrish of Harbledown, Kent, England.  It forms part of the civil parish of Harbledown and Rough Common.

External links

Villages in Kent